Cambridge Bay Airport  is located  southwest of Cambridge Bay, Nunavut, Canada, and is operated by the government of Nunavut.

In December 2005 the Government of Nunavut announced that they would spend $18 million to pave the runway.

On 14 May 2008 a press release from the then Premier of Nunavut, Paul Okalik, and Member of the Legislative Assembly, Keith Peterson, indicated that over the next three years the runway would be widened and lengthened.

Airlines and destinations

Scheduled

Charter

Cargo

Accidents 

 On 13 December 2008, a Dornier 228 C-FYEV with 14 people on board operated by Summit Air Charters, was on approach at Cambridge Bay after a flight from Resolute Bay Airport when the aircraft collided with terrain about  short of runway 31. One flight crew member and one passenger received minor injuries.

See also
Cambridge Bay Water Aerodrome

References

External links

Page about this airport on COPA's Places to Fly airport directory

Certified airports in the Kitikmeot Region